Ri-Bhoi College, established in 1984, is a general degree college at Nongpoh, in Meghalaya. This college is affiliated with the North Eastern Hill University. This college offers bachelor's degrees in arts.

References

For more details please refer the following site. https://www.ribhoicollege.ac.in

External links
http://www.ribhoicollege.ac.in

Universities and colleges in Meghalaya
Colleges affiliated to North-Eastern Hill University
Educational institutions established in 1984
1984 establishments in Meghalaya